Complementary architecture is a movement in contemporary architecture promoting architectural practice rooted in comprehensive understanding of context, aiming to contribute to the environment in such a way as to continue and improve or emphasise its preexisting qualities. Indispensable features of complementary architecture include sustainability, altruism, contextualism, endemism and continuity of specific regional design language.

Complementary architecture occurs at the intersection of local pattern and design languages. A pattern language represents a set of more or less formalised rules of human interaction with built forms, resulting from practical solutions developed over time according to local culture and natural conditions. A design language in architecture is a set of geometrical (formal) and material standards used in buildings and other man-made structures, traditionally arising from local materials and their physical properties.

Complementary architecture interprets the Vitruvian triad for contemporary use, mapping durability (firmitas) against aspects of broader sustainability, utility (utilitas) against altruism and service to society, and individual beauty (venustas) against harmony with broader context, regional identity and spirit of place.

Continuity in architecture 
Historically, building environments were produced in a continuous, evolutionary fashion rather than as singular revolutionary events. Complementary architecture involves systematic analysis of traditional techniques in the context of vibrant urban environments, aiming to rediscover sustainable, layered, nuanced, contextual and environmentally appropriate solutions for the present time.

Applications 
Practically all traditional vernacular and formal architecture produced prior to the 20th century is complementary architecture due to inherent material and cultural constraints, as are many works inspired by some contemporary movements such as contextual architecture, indigenous architecture, organic architecture or new urbanism. 

Complementary architecture methodology is especially useful where contemporary development penetrates compact historical urban fabric. Complementary design pays respect to its architectural context while carefully introducing contemporary design elements.

Critical views 
The movement specifically rejects the tendency of contemporary architects to construct buildings rather than cities, neglecting the fact that the value of a building stays in the architectural whole, as well as modernism's contrasting with nature or context for the sake of innovation as expedient and inevitably destructive. Adherents posit that in the 20th century the abdication of decorative elements and traditional forms was thought to be a sign of newly found simplicity, solidarity and sacrifice by the socialist and conveniently cost-efficient by the capitalist side of the political scene. By extension, that "nearly every building completed prior to the 20th century was beautiful" and that the matter of beauty in contemporary and future architecture as simply a matter of "recovering old habits".

Contemporary examples

See also 

 European Urban Renaissance
 Architectural design values
 Critical regionalism
 Sustainable architecture

References 

Architectural theory
Sustainability
Sustainable architecture